Khruli is a village in northeastern Ukraine, specifically in Myrhorod Raion of Poltava Oblast.

External links
 Сensus books of Malorossia (1666)

Populated places established in 1649
Villages in Myrhorod Raion